was a Crown Prince of the Ryūkyū Kingdom, the son of King Shō Tei.

At the age of 9, he was named Prince of Nakagusuku, and given Sashiki and Nakagusuku magiri as his domains. His domain was changed to that of Kume Gushikawa magiri in 1676, and to Sashiki and Nakazato magiri in 1689.

He died in 1706 before being able to succeed to the throne of the kingdom, and was entombed in the royal mausoleum of Tamaudun.

References
"Shō Jun." Okinawa konpakuto jiten (沖縄コンパクト事典, "Okinawa Compact Encyclopedia"). Ryukyu Shimpo (琉球新報). 1 March 2003. Accessed 3 January 2009.

1660 births
1706 deaths
Princes of Ryūkyū
Second Shō dynasty